S. S. Balaji (born 24 September 1970) is an Indian Tamil politician and lawyer from the Viduthalai Chiruthaigal Katchi (VCK). He has been serving as Member of the Tamil Nadu Legislative Assembly from Thiruporur constituency since May 2021.

Education 
He got his Bachelor of Engineering (BE) degree in 1991. Later, in 2015, he obtained Bachelor of Laws (LLB) from Sri Venkateswara University (Tirupati, Andhra Pradesh).

Electoral performance

References 

Tamil Nadu MLAs 2021–2026
Living people
Viduthalai Chiruthaigal Katchi politicians
Tamil Nadu politicians
1970 births